The Prada Cup is the name of the Challenger Selection Series - a sailing competition to determine the Challenger that will earn the right to challenge the Defender for the conquest of the America's Cup. Prior to 2021, the series was named the Louis Vuitton Cup.

See also 
 America's Cup
 Louis Vuitton Cup
 Herbert Pell Cup
 Prada Cup 2021

References

External links
 

Recurring sporting events established in 2021
Match racing competitions